Gardnar Putnam "Gar" Mulloy (November 22, 1913 – November 14, 2016) was a U.S. No. 1 tennis player primarily known for playing in doubles matches with partner Billy Talbert. He was born in Washington, D.C. and turned 100 in November 2013. During his career he won five Grand Slam doubles tournaments and was a member of the winning Davis Cup team on three occasions.

Mulloy played collegiate tennis for the Miami Hurricanes at the University of Miami in Coral Gables, Florida.

Tennis career
While he was the tennis coach at the University of Miami, Mulloy recruited Pancho Segura for the tennis team. Segura won three straight NCAA singles titles in 1943, 1944, and 1945. Segura went on to enjoy a successful professional tennis career, competing against the top touring professional players from 1947 until his retirement in 1962.

Mulloy was inducted into the University of Miami Sports Hall of Fame in 1967 as part of its inaugural class of inductees.

Mulloy reached the U.S. Championships men's singles final in 1952, losing to second-seeded Frank Sedgman in three straight sets. He reached the U.S. No. 1 ranking the same year and was ranked world No. 6 by Harry Hopman in 1947 and world No. 7 by American Lawn Tennis Magazine in 1949.

The pair of Mulloy and Talbert won the U.S. men's doubles title in 1942, 1945, 1946, and 1948. He also won the Wimbledon doubles with Budge Patty in 1957, at age 43.

Mulloy was a Davis Cup team member in 1946, 1948–50, 1952–53 and 1957, winning the Cup on three occasions against Australia. His Davis Cup record stands at 11 wins and 3 losses. Mulloy, who served as the commanding officer of USS LST-32 during World War II in the Mediterranean Theater, was inducted into the International Tennis Hall of Fame in Newport, Rhode Island, in 1972.

In 2015 Mulloy was awarded a French Legion of Honor knighthood for his service in the US Navy in relation to operations in Italy and Provence. As such he became the oldest first time recipient of the order ever since it was created by Napoleon.

Mulloy was a 1936 graduate of the University of Miami, and tennis coach at the school. He also was a member of Lambda Chi Alpha fraternity. He recruited to Miami and played doubles with George Toley, who went on to win 10 NCAA team titles at the University of Southern California. Probably Mulloy's greatest contribution to tennis was advancing the popularity of senior tennis. He played the senior circuit around the world into his nineties, and established the Mulloy Cup for international competition between men tennis players 80 years of age and over. He won over 127 national championships and 25 international titles in 75 years of playing competitive tennis.

As of 2006, Mulloy was still participating in and winning senior matches.

Personal life
In 1938, Mulloy married Madeleine L. Cheney (1917–1993), with whom he had two daughters, Diane Mulloy Mazzone and Janice Mulloy Poindexter. He married his second wife, Jacqueline Mayer, in 2008, when he was 95 years old. Mulloy was a vegetarian and avoided alcohol, coffee, sugary drinks and tea.

Mulloy died in Miami on November 14, 2016, from stroke complications, aged 102, survived by his second wife, his daughters, four grandchildren, and nine great-grandchildren.

Grand Slam finals

Singles (1 runner-up)

Doubles (5 titles, 9 runners-up)

Mixed doubles (2 runner-ups)

Book
Mulloy wrote an autobiography, The Will To Win, that was published in 1960. In 2009, he released an update to his autobiography, titled As It Was, with an introduction by Billie Jean King. According to the book, Mulloy is enshrined in a record nine Halls of Fame.

References
Notes

Bibliography

 Mulloy, Gardnar. The Will To Win. An insider view of the world of tennis. New York: A. S. Barnes and Company, Inc., 1960.
 Mulloy, Gardnar. Advantage Striker. London: Allan Wingate, 1959.
 Mulloy, Gardnar P. As It Was. Flexigroup, 2009. . A print-on-demand paperback book.
 Toley, George "The Golden Age of College Tennis" 2009

External links
 
 
 
 

1913 births
2016 deaths
American centenarians
American male non-fiction writers
American male tennis players
Grand Slam (tennis) champions in men's doubles
International Tennis Hall of Fame inductees
Men centenarians
Tennis players from Washington, D.C.
United States National champions (tennis)
University of Miami alumni
Wimbledon champions (pre-Open Era)